Marcel Jean Marie Alessandri (July 23, 1895 – December 23, 1968) was a French army officer who served in the World War I, World War II, and the First Indochina War. During World War II, he was stationed in French Indochina where he ultimately assumed supreme command of the French forces in China, in addition to assuming responsibility for the administration of the French government in China. In the course of his military career he received the Croix de Guerre twelve times in addition to numerous other citations and commendations.


Early life
Marcel Alessandri was born on July 23, 1895, in Boulogne-sur-Mer, France. On July 1, 1914, Alessandri entered the École spéciale militaire de Saint-Cyr where his education was shortly thereafter interrupted by the outbreak of the World War I.

First World War
On December 5, 1914, Alessandri was commissioned as a second lieutenant (Sous-Lieutenant) in the 39th Infantry Regiment. Alessandri was promoted to a full lieutenant on the March 16, 1916. He was wounded in action on September 16, 1916. Alessandri later served with the 8th Infantry Regiment and the 123rd Infantry Regiment during the war. Lieutenant Alessandri received a temporary promotion to Captain on July 17, 1917. In the course of the First World War, Marcel Alessandri received twelve Croix de guerre 1914–1918 citations and was named a Chevallier of the Légion d'honneur.

Inter-war years
After the First World War and a second stint at école spéciale militaire de Saint-Cyr, Marcel Alessandri chose to enter the French Colonial Infantry and joined the 7th Colonial Infantry Regiment in Morocco on September 16, 1919. Alessandri participated in the French campaigns in Morocco during this time and was awarded a Croix de guerre des théâtres d'opérations extérieures. He received a permanent commission as a Captain on March 20, 1920. Alessandri was assigned to the 21st Colonial Infantry Regiment in French Indochina on April 8, 1922. He later served in French West Africa and attended the French War College in 1928 before returning to Morocco in 1930. His posting in Morocco was follow by staff assignments back in France at the Colonial Forces Headquarters and as an instructor at the War College. On April 12, 1939, Alessandri returned to French Indochina.

World War II
During World War II, Colonel Alessandri was stationed in French Indochina. In 1940 following the fall of France, the colony remained loyal to the Vichy government. From 1940 to 1943, Colonel Alessandri was the commanding officer of the 5th Foreign Infantry Regiment until he was promoted to brigadier general on May 20, 1943. Following his promotion to brigadier general, Alessandri assumed command of the Western Red River Group (Groupement Ouest du fleuve Rouge). After the Japanese coup of March 9, 1945, General Alessandri led his remaining forces on a fighting retreat  towards Chinese territory.

First Indochina War
On August 17, 1948, General Alessandri was appointed to the Command of the Ground Forces in the Far East (commandement des forces terrestres en Extrême-Orient). Later he would take command of the Operational Area of Tonkin. General Alessandri was removed from this position following the disastrous Battle of Route Coloniale 4 and he returned to France on November 20, 1950.

Later life and legacy
On July 23, 1955, after reaching mandatory retirement age, Major General Marcel Alessandri retired and returned to France. By the end of his military career, Marcel Alessandri had received twelve separate Croix de Guerre citations, had been awarded the Grand Officer of Légion d'honneur, and numerous other foreign decorations. Alessandri died on December 26, 1968, in Paris, France.

Promotions
 Second Lieutenant December 5, 1914
 Lieutenant March 9, 1916
 Captain July 5, 1917
 Chef de Battalion 1930
 Lieutenant-colonel March 17, 1936
 Colonel March 25, 1941
 Brigadier General May 20, 1943
 Major General 1945

Awards and commendations
France
 Grand Officer of the Legion of Honour (1950); Chevalier (1916), Officer (1930), Commander (1945)
 Medal of the Resistance (Official Gazette of 20 March 1948)
 Croix de Guerre 1914–1918
 Croix de Guerre 1939–1945
 Croix de guerre des théâtres d'opérations extérieures
 Colonial Medal with "Morocco" and "Indochine" clasps
 Memorial Medal of the 1914–1918 War
 Memorial Medal of the 1939–1945 war
 Médaille Interalliée 1914–1918
 Memorial medal of the Indochina campaign

Foreign
 Commander of the Order of Ouissam Alaouite
 Grand Cross of the Royal Order of Cambodia
 Military Medal of Cambodia
 Medal of resistance in Laos
 British Order of the Bath (Honorary)

References

1895 births
1968 deaths
People from Boulogne-sur-Mer
French generals
Knights Grand Cross of the Royal Order of Cambodia
Officers of the French Foreign Legion
Grand Officiers of the Légion d'honneur
Recipients of the Resistance Medal
Recipients of the Croix de Guerre 1914–1918 (France)
Recipients of the Croix de Guerre 1939–1945 (France)
Recipients of the Croix de guerre des théâtres d'opérations extérieures
Honorary Companions of the Order of the Bath